Collie is a village and parish in central New South Wales, Australia. At the 2016 census, Collie and the surrounding area had a population of 194. The name, Collie, could have derived from an Aboriginal word meaning "water".

References

Towns in New South Wales